Peter Boncz is a Dutch computer scientist specializing in database systems. He is a researcher at the Centrum Wiskunde & Informatica and professor at the Vrije Universiteit Amsterdam in the special chair of Large-Scale Analytical Data Management.

He is a pioneer and expert in the area of high performance, analytical database systems. As part of his PhD work, he designed MonetDB, one of the first relational column database systems. MonetDB is widely influential in the design of commercial analytical database systems and in recognition the team received 10-year Best Paper Award at VLDB 2009. In 2004 he started the MonetDB/X100 research project, aiming to significantly improve the performance of MonetDB via vectorized processing. This research project led to a commercial spin-off VectorWise.

Boncz's research in database technologies created 3 spin-off companies. Data Distilleries (1996-2003) focused on developing data mining software and used MonetDB as its backend. Data Distilleries was acquired by SPSS in 2003. MonetDB BV (2008-present) provides consulting and support service for MonetDB users. Vectorwise (2008-2010) commercialized the X100 research project and was acquired by Actian in 2010.

Boncz was named to the 2022 class of ACM Fellows, "for contributions to the design of columnar, main-memory, and vectorized database systems".

References

External links
Website at CWI

Dutch computer scientists
Living people
21st-century Dutch scientists
Year of birth missing (living people)
Database researchers
Scientists from Amsterdam
Academic staff of the University of Amsterdam
Fellows of the Association for Computing Machinery